Shoe at Your Foot (() is a 2009 Franco-Canadian romantic comedy film directed by Jennifer Devoldère.

Cast 
 Mélanie Laurent as Chloe
 Justin Bartha as Jack
 Valérie Benguigui as Myriam
 Billy Boyd as Rufus
 Maurice Bénichou as Receptionist
 Géraldine Nakache as Josée
  as Didier
 Dorothée Berryman as Jack's mother
 Jessica Paré as Liza
 Jackie Berroyer as Chloé's father
 Éric Berger as Jérome 
  as Pedro

References

External links 

2009 romantic comedy films
2009 films
Canadian romantic comedy films
French romantic comedy films
Quebec films
French-language Canadian films
2000s Canadian films
2000s French films